The 2022 NAPA Auto Parts 150 was an ARCA Menards Series West race that was held on July 2, 2022, at the Irwindale Speedway in Irwindale, California. It was contested over 154 laps on the  oval due to an overtime finish. It was the sixth race of the 2022 ARCA Menards Series West season. Jake Drew led every lap en route to a dominating third-consecutive victory.

Background

Entry list 

 (R) denotes rookie driver.
 (i) denotes driver who is ineligible for series driver points.

Practice/Qualifying

Starting Lineups

Race

Race results

References 

2022 in sports in California
NAPA Auto Parts 150
2022 ARCA Menards Series West